The Philippine two hundred-peso note (₱200) is a denomination of Philippine currency. President Diosdado Macapagal is currently featured on the front side of the note, and since 2017, President Gloria Macapagal Arroyo's inauguration as the 14th President of the Philippines (EDSA People Power II) is on the lower-left side on the note just in front of the scene of the Declaration of Philippine Independence, and the scene of the opening of the Malolos Congress is also present on the obverse side of the note. From 2010 to 2017, the Aguinaldo Shrine (labeled as "Independence House") and the Barasoain Church were featured on the front side of the note. The Chocolate Hills and the Philippine tarsier is featured on the reverse side. Currently, it is the rarest banknote circulating in the country, and thus is seen more as a novelty than legal tender.

History

Pre-independence
1852: El Banco Español Filipino de Isabel II (modern-day Bank of the Philippine Islands) issued 200 pesos fuertes notes.
1903-1928: BPI issued notes. Features a vignette of Lady Justice on the front.

Independence
Macapagal first appeared on the two hundred peso bill upon the reintroduction of the denomination in 2002.
1951: English series, Features the portrait of Manuel L. Quezon, the 1st president of the Commonwealth of the Philippines. The reverse features the Old Legislative Building. The Legislative Building was later featured on the fifty peso bill upon the introduction of the Pilipino series notes.
1959: The 200 and 500 peso notes were withdrawn from circulation on December 31, 1959, pursuant to Philippine Republic Act No. 1516.
2002: New Design series, The two hundred peso denomination was not included in the Pilipino and Ang Bagong Lipunan series. The denomination however was reintroduced in 2002, when the New Design Series notes was then currently being circulated. The note features the portrait of Diosdado P. Macapagal, the 9th President of the Philippines. The obverse also features the Aguinaldo Shrine, where Emilio Aguinaldo proclaimed the country's independence in 1898, on the lower right corner. The reverse features a scene from EDSA II, with Gloria Macapagal Arroyo, Macapagal's daughter, being sworn in as president by Chief Justice Hilario Davide Jr. in January 2001. The color of the note is predominantly green. This marks the return of Aguinaldo Shrine on a banknote after the printing of the five peso note (which is also colored green) was stopped seven years earlier in 1995.
2010: New Generation series, The portrait of Diosdado P. Macapagal was revised, the Arroyo oathtaking was moved from the reverse to the lower left of the obverse with the Aguinaldo Shrine at the background and the Barasoain Church was added on the lower middle. The reverse now features the Chocolate Hills and the Philippine tarsier.
2017: An updated version of the New Generation series 200 piso banknote was issued with several changes, notably replacing the images of the Aguinaldo Shrine and the Barasoain Church on the front with scenes of the Declaration of Philippine Independence and the opening of the Malolos Congress respectively. Also changed for this issue are the font size of the year of issue and the italicization of the scientific name on the reverse.
2020: In 2020, an "enhanced" version of the 200 peso New Generation Currency banknote was released. It added color-changing indigenous patterns to the security threads. Also, six tactile marks were placed for the elderly and the visually impaired, three tactile marks were placed on the extreme left and right side of the front of the note.
2022: The new BSP logo, which was redesigned in January 2021 was adopted in all NGC banknotes starting with the 2022 issued banknotes featuring the signatures of President Ferdinand Marcos Jr. and BSP Governor Felipe Medalla.

Version history

Commemorative issues

60 years of Central Banking commemorative bill - On July 9, 2009, the Bangko Sentral ng Pilipinas introduced 12 million banknotes (2 million banknotes for each denomination) with an overprint commemorating 60 years of central banking. The overprint appears on the watermark area on all six circulating denominations.
UST Quadricentennial commemorative bill - Unveiled before the press conference held on January 21, 2011, Bangko Sentral ng Pilipinas (BSP) issued commemorative 200-peso bills with the Quadricentennial logo (Tongues of Fire) of the University of Santo Tomas (UST) overprinted on it. BSP released two-billion-pesos (10 million notes) worth of these 200-peso bills—in general circulation and legal tender. In addition, the central bank also released 400 copies of uncut two-piece 200-peso bills (amounting to PhP 400.00).

Printing years

Notes

Banknotes of the Philippines
Two-hundred-base-unit banknotes